Thomas Gange (15 April 1891 – 11 July 1947) was an English cricketer. He played for Gloucestershire between 1913 and 1920.

References

1891 births
1947 deaths
Cricketers from Pietermaritzburg
English cricketers
Gloucestershire cricketers
Colony of Natal emigrants to the United Kingdom